Unite to Remain was a campaign and electoral pact during the 2019 United Kingdom general election. It involved three parties that supported remaining in the European Union: the Liberal Democrats, the Green Party of England and Wales, and, in Wales, Plaid Cymru. Its stated goal was to avoid the spoiler effect and maximise the number of MPs elected who would oppose Brexit.

In 49 constituencies in England and 11 in Wales, the pact led to only one of these parties standing a candidate. Of the 60 constituencies, 43 had Liberal Democrat candidates only, 10 had Green Party candidates only, and 7 had Plaid Cymru candidates only. The seats covered by the pact included some defended by a Unite to Remain party, as well as target seats held by the Conservative or Labour parties.

Nine Unite to Remain candidates were elected (5 Liberal Democrats, 3 Plaid Cymru, 1 Green), which represented one gain and one loss compared to the 2017 general election results.

Details
Though there was no formal pact, the August 2019 Brecon and Radnorshire by-election saw the Greens and Plaid Cymru stand aside for the Liberal Democrat candidate Jane Dodds, who defeated the Conservative candidate by a small margin. This arrangement was mooted as being the basis for a wider-ranging "Remain Alliance".

The Unite to Remain group which brokered the pact was formed by the outgoing MP for South Cambridgeshire, Heidi Allen and former Liberal Democrat Treasurer Peter Dunphy in July 2019. The alliance approached the Labour party at an early stage, but were rebuffed. The Labour peer Jim Knight was one of the directors of Unite to Remain. The group was registered as a "non-party campaigner" with the Electoral Commission in November 2019.

Seats were selected based on a targeted pooling of resources and only with the consent of local parties.  All the parties also support electoral reform. Liberal Democrat activists in constituencies where their party stood aside were encouraged to either campaign for the Unite to Remain candidate there, or to campaign in a nearby seat.

On 13 November 2019, Unite to Remain and the Renew Party announced that Renew would not contest any of the 60 Unite to Remain target seats.

List of constituencies
Incumbents marked in italics did not stand for re-election in that constituency.

Darker rows indicate constituencies where the Unite to Remain party won the previous election (the 2017 general election or the 2019 Brecon and Radnorshire by-election). The pact also covers three seats where, during the 2017–2019 Parliament, incumbent MPs defected from other parties to the Liberal Democrats.

Pre-election analysis 
Psephologist John Curtice stated that the pact could be critical in "half a dozen" seats that could have otherwise been won by the Conservatives.

An analysis published in the Financial Times attempted to evaluate the potential impact of the pact. This analysis applied uniform regional swing based on polling (as of early November) to the 2017 result to estimate the parties' standings in the seats before the pact, then assumed that voters for parties standing aside would transfer their support as per the pact. The analysis found that in 18 seats the Unite to Remain party would not need the pact in order to win, in 39 the pact would be insufficient to secure victory, and in two (Brecon and Radnorshire and Winchester) the pact would make the critical difference between winning and losing for the Unite to Remain party.

Other pro-Remain arrangements
In addition to the Unite to Remain pact, the Liberal Democrats did not stand candidates against the following anti-Brexit or "soft Brexit" supporting incumbents:
Dominic Grieve (independent), Beaconsfield
Gavin Shuker (independent), Luton South
Anna Soubry (The Independent Group for Change), Broxtowe

All failed to be elected.

In Canterbury, the original Liberal Democrat candidate (Tim Walker) stood down in aid of the Labour incumbent Rosie Duffield, but the Lib Dems stood a replacement candidate. Duffield retained her seat.

In Northern Ireland, Sinn Féin, the SDLP and the Green Party in Northern Ireland all stood aside in certain constituencies to increase the chances of anti-Brexit candidates.

See also 
2019 United Kingdom general election#Electoral pacts and unilateral decisions

References

External links
 

2019 United Kingdom general election
Brexit
Defunct political party alliances in the United Kingdom
European Union–related advocacy groups in the United Kingdom
Green Party of England and Wales
Liberal Democrats (UK)
Plaid Cymru
Political advocacy groups in the United Kingdom
Pro-Europeanism in the United Kingdom